The Patsy Cline Story is a double compilation album consisting of American country music singer Patsy Cline's best-known songs between 1961 and 1963. The album was released on June 10, 1963, three months following Cline's death.

Background
The Patsy Cline Story is a 24-track two-disc collection Cline's label, Decca Records released following Cline's death in a plane crash in March of that year. The album contains Cline's biggest hits, including "Walkin' After Midnight" (the 1961 remake), "I Fall to Pieces," "Crazy," "She's Got You," and "Sweet Dreams." It also contains lesser-known songs that weren't hits for Cline, including "You're Stronger Than Me."
The Patsy Cline Story replaced Cline's fourth studio album that was supposed to be released in the end of March 1963, Faded Love, but due to her death in early March, it was never released.
The album included two singles that were released posthumously in 1963, "Leavin' on Your Mind" and "Sweet Dreams (Of You)," both of which reached the Top 10 on the Billboard Country Chart.

When Decca Records changed to MCA Records in 1973, the album was re-issued and the insert in the gatefold was also changed. Shortly afterward, copies eliminated the gatefold completely, and therefore both of the records were contained in a single sleeve. In 1988, the album was digitally remastered and reissued again on a CD format with a new cover.

Individual tracks
While the album features Cline's most well-known hits, the album also contains additional extras 
including Bob Wills' "San Antonio Rose" and Gogi Grant's "The Wayward Wind," both from Cline's 1961 studio album, Patsy Cline Showcase. It also contains her 1962 hits, "So Wrong" and "Imagine That," which were never released on albums before.

Track listing

Personnel
 Harold Bradley – electric bass
 Owen Bradley – producer
 Patsy Cline – vocals
 Floyd Cramer – piano
 Ray Edenton – rhythm guitar
 Hank Garland – electric guitar
 Buddy Harman – drums
 Hoyt Hawkins – background vocals
 Walter Haynes – steel guitar
 Randy Hughes – rhythm guitar
 Joe Jenkins – acoustic bass
 The Jordanaires – background vocals
 Ben Keith – steel guitar
 Douglas Kirkham – drums
 Millie Kirkham – background vocals
 Grady Martin – electric guitar
 Neal Matthews Jr. – background vocals
 Bob Moore – acoustic bass
 Bill Pursell – organ, vibraphone
 Hargus "Pig" Robbins – piano
 Gordon Stoker – background vocals
 Ray C. Walker – background vocals
 Rita Faye Wilson – autoharp

Charts
Album – Billboard (North America)

Singles - Billboard (North America)

References

Patsy Cline albums
Albums produced by Owen Bradley
1963 compilation albums
Decca Records compilation albums
MCA Records compilation albums
Compilation albums published posthumously